School of Management, HIT is the business school of Harbin Institute of Technology. It has three campuses, including Harbin campus, Weihai campus and Shenzhen campus.

There are approximately 213 full—time faculty members consisting of assistant, associate, and full professors.

History 
School of Management, HIT is one of the oldest business school in China. The school traces its origins to 1920, when several institutes were merged to form a single School of Management. The earliest courses offered included engineering economics, transportation economics and railway administration.
During the 1950s, the school received strategic support from scholars from the Soviet Union, and pioneered the teaching and research of management and economics in China.
A large number of scholars and government officials graduated from this school.

MBA programs
The MBA program of School of Management, HIT received accreditation from Association of MBAs, and is the first accredited business school in Northeast China.

Big Data & BA Summer School
Big Data & BA Summer School is a one-week training program. Scholars and professionals of information system, FinTech, Marketing and related areas are invited as faculty members to lecture on research methodologies and cutting-edge topics of big data and business analytics.
The professors include Anindya Ghose, Arun Rai, Qiang Ye and Yong Tan.

References

External links 
 
 
Big Data & BA Summer School website

Business schools in China
Harbin Institute of Technology